SLMC may refer to:
 Sri Lanka Medical Council
 Sri Lanka Muslim Congress
 St. Luke's Medical Center
 Second Life Military Combat